The Detective is a 2007 Hong Kong neo-noir mystery thriller film directed by Oxide Pang, and starring Aaron Kwok as a private investigator hired to track down a missing young woman who may be linked to a series of murders in Thailand. The film was followed by a sequel, The Detective 2, which was released in 2011.

Plot
Tam (Aaron Kwok) is an impoverished private detective. One day, a guy nicknamed Fatty asks Tam to find a lady who wants to kill him. He leaves Tam a portrait and a large amount of cash without giving any other details. Tam cannot resist the offer and so his investigation starts.

Knowing that Sum, the lady in the picture, is a frequent visitor of a store where the picture was shot, Tam tries to get hints of her whereabouts from the storekeepers. He is told to find her through her mahjong playmates. Tam starts with Ming, but when he arrives at Ming's home, he finds Ming hanged in the living room.

As Tam continues to search for other mahjong playmates of Sum, he is shocked to find each of them murdered every time he is about to contact with them. He discovers a half-burned photo at one of the scenes. Tam realizes the suspicions behind the deaths and decides to protect the next target of the invisible murderer. The photo is the only clue for Tam to solve the case.

Cast
 Aaron Kwok as Tam
 Liu Kai-chi as Inspector Fung Chak
 Wayne Lai as Sai Wing
 Kenny Wong as Kwong Chi-hung
 Shing Fui-On as Fei Lung
 Jo Koo as Yin

Reception

References

External links
 

2007 films
2000s mystery films
2007 crime thriller films
Hong Kong crime thriller films
Hong Kong neo-noir films
Hong Kong detective films
2000s Cantonese-language films
Films directed by Oxide Pang
Films set in Thailand
Films shot in Thailand
2000s Hong Kong films